Black Draw is a valley, and tributary stream within the San Bernardino Valley of Cochise County, Arizona.

References

Rivers of Cochise County, Arizona
Rivers of Arizona